Lophocampa luxa is a moth of the subfamily Arctiinae. It was described by Augustus Radcliffe Grote in 1866. It is found on Cuba.

Description

References

luxa
Moths described in 1866
Endemic fauna of Cuba